The 2006 congressional elections in Michigan was held on November 4, 2006 to determine who would represent the state of Michigan in the United States House of Representatives. Michigan had fifteen seats in the House, apportioned according to the 2000 United States Census. Representatives are elected for two-year terms. All fifteen incumbents ran for re-election, and all of them got re-elected except Joe Schwarz, who lost his primary.

Overview

Match-up summary

District 1 

Incumbent Democrat Bart Stupak won re-election to an eighth term.

District 2 

Incumbent Republican Pete Hoekstra won re-election to an eighth term.

District 3 

Incumbent Republican Vern Ehlers won re-election to an eighth term.

District 4 

Incumbent Republican David Lee Camp won re-election to a ninth term.

District 5 

Incumbent Democratic Dale Kildee won re-election to a thirteenth term.

District 6 

Incumbent Republican Fred Upton won re-election to an eleventh term.

District 7 

Republican Tim Walberg defeated the incumbent in the primary, and won the general election.

District 8 

Incumbent Republican Mike Rogers won re-election to a fourth term.

District 9 

Incumbent Republican Joe Knollenberg won re-election to an eighth term.

District 10 

Incumbent Republican Candice Miller won re-election to a third term.

District 11 

Incumbent Republican Thad McCotter won re-election to a third term.

District 12 

Incumbent Democrat Sander Levin won re-election to a thirteenth term.

District 13 

Incumbent Democrat Carolyn Cheeks Kilpatrick won re-election, unopposed, to a sixth term.

District 14 

Incumbent Democrat John Conyers won re-election to an X term.

District 15 

Incumbent Democrat John Dingell won re-election to a twenty-seventh term.

References

2006 Michigan elections
2006
Michigan